Phyllanthus pulcher, the tropical leaf-flower, is a species in the genus Phyllanthus. Phyllanthus pulcher is known commonly as a weed. Its leaves fold closed at night (an example of Nyctinasty).

References

pulcher